WIBZ (95.5 FM, "Z95.5") is a radio station broadcasting an adult hits format focusing on music from the 60's-2000's.  Licensed to Wedgefield, South Carolina, United States, the station is currently owned by Community Broadcasters, LLC.

History
The station went on the air as WIBZ on 1985-02-05.

In the 1970s, WIBZ was "99Z. The Rock of The Valley" delivering album and alternative rock music to the Parkersburg, West Virginia/Marietta, Ohio broadcast market.

References

External links

IBZ
Radio stations established in 1985
1985 establishments in South Carolina